Plaquemines Parish School Board (PPSB) is a school district headquartered in unincorporated Plaquemines Parish, Louisiana, United States.

The district serves Plaquemines Parish.

School uniforms
All Plaquemines Parish public schools require school uniforms.

Schools
All schools are located in unincorporated areas.

K-12 schools
 Phoenix High School

High schools
 7-12
 South Plaquemines High School 
 9-12
 Belle Chasse High School

4-8 schools
 Belle Chasse Middle School

PK-6 schools
 Boothville-Venice Elementary School
 South Plaquemines Elementary School

PK-4 schools
 Belle Chasse Primary School

Former schools
The following consolidated into South Plaquemines High School after Hurricane Katrina and Hurricane Rita:
 Port Sulphur High School - PK-12
 Buras Middle School (6-8)
 Buras High School (PreK-5 and 9–12)
 Boothville-Venice High School (PreK-12)

References

External links
 Plaquemines Parish School Board

School districts in Louisiana
Education in Plaquemines Parish, Louisiana